Alena Nazdrova (born 10 November 1998) is a Belarusian sprint canoeist.

She participated at the 2018 ICF Canoe Sprint World Championships.

References

External links

1998 births
Living people
Belarusian female canoeists
ICF Canoe Sprint World Championships medalists in Canadian
Canoeists at the 2019 European Games
European Games medalists in canoeing
European Games gold medalists for Belarus
Canoeists at the 2020 Summer Olympics
Olympic canoeists of Belarus
21st-century Belarusian women